Brian Easton (born 1943) is an economist and historian from New Zealand. He was the economics columnist for the New Zealand Listener magazine for 37 years (1977–2014), giving him a high public profile nationally. He has held a number of university teaching posts and also works as an independent commentator. Easton is known for his criticism of economic orthodoxy.

Background
Easton was born in 1943 and grew up in Christchurch, New Zealand. He holds degrees in mathematics and economics from the University of Canterbury, and in economics from Victoria University of Wellington.

Career
Easton was director of the New Zealand Institute of Economic Research from 1981 to 1986. He is a Fellow of the Royal Statistical Society, a Chartered Statistician, and a Member of the Royal Society of New Zealand.

Academia
Easton has held a number of scholarships and fellowships including visiting fellowships at the University of Melbourne, as Richard Downing Research Professor, Georgetown and Harvard Universities, as a Fulbright NZ Distinguished Visiting Fellow and a Marsden Fellowship (2003–2006). In 2002 he was appointed to the New Zealand Prime Minister's Growth and Innovation Advisory Board and, in 2005, he was made a Distinguished Fellow of the New Zealand Association of Economists. He has documented his current work activity and interests in his personal web site.

Selected works
 Easton, Brian, Not in Narrow Seas: The Economic History of Aotearoa New Zealand. Victoria University Press, 2020, 
Easton, Brian, Heke tangata: Māori in markets and cities. Te Whānau o Waipareira Trust, 2018, 
Easton, Brian, Globalisation and the wealth of nations. Auckland University Press, 2007, 
Easton, Brian, The whimpering of the state: Policy after MMP. Auckland University Press, 1999, 
 Easton, Brian H., The Commercialisation of New Zealand. Auckland University Press, 1997, 
 Easton, Brian H., In stormy seas: The post-war New Zealand economy. Otago University Press, 1997, 
 Easton, Brian H., The making of Rogernomics. Oxford University Press, 1989, 
 Easton, Brian H., Social policy and the welfare state in New Zealand. Allen & Unwin, 1980,

References

1943 births
Living people
20th-century New Zealand economists
University of Canterbury alumni
Victoria University of Wellington alumni
Fellows of the Royal Statistical Society
New Zealand statisticians
People from Christchurch
21st-century New Zealand economists
Recipients of Marsden grants